Pamela Pepperidge Conrad (formerly Capwell) is a fictional character from the American soap opera Santa Barbara. She was first portrayed by actress Shirley Anne Field from October 13 to December 28, 1987, and was then replaced by Marj Dusay, who portrayed the role from December 29, 1987, to July 7, 1988. Dusay returned as a guest star from February 25 to March 4, 1991.

Character history
Although she was mentioned multiple times during the early years of the series as the first wife of wealthy businessman C.C. Capwell, Pamela was never seen on the show until 1987. Pamela's marriage to C.C. had dissolved shortly after the birth of their son Mason. Pamela spent some years in England, where she fell in love with Michael Conrad and gave birth to Jeffrey Conrad, their son.

After her husband's death, Pamela returns to Santa Barbara in secret, hiding a disfiguring disease. She is cured by her friend Dr. Alex Nikolas. Having recovered, Pamela tries to win C.C. away from his wife Sophia by revealing that the deranged Elena Nikolas actually their daughter. Pamela successfully seduces C.C., however he comes to see the affair as a mistake and eventually returns to Sophia. Pamela later learns that Jeffrey is dating C.C. and Sophia's daughter Kelly, and she then hires a man to break them up.

Pamela pretended to be the dutiful mother-in-law when Jeffrey and Kelly married, but in reality she desperately plotted the end of the marriage. After some failed business dealings thanks to C.C.'s interference in her newly successful oil company, Pamela blamed C.C. for the death of Hal Clark. However, it was later revealed by Dr. Scott Clark, who had undergone hypnosis, that Pamela had actually been the one who murdered Hal. Fearing that she might be locked up, Pamela tried to kill Kelly, but didn't succeed. She was apprehended by the police and Mason told her that he wanted nothing further to do with her.

In 1991, Pamela returned to town supposedly cured of her madness, winning the affection of her son Mason again during a point where he was particularly vulnerable to his mother's love. Pamela was used by him to upset his father and Sophia, given the same dress that Sophia had worn at her third wedding to C.C. to wear to a Capwell family dinner. Memories of her past life were too traumatic for Pamela to handle, and in the middle of the dinner, she began to babble, ultimately trying to strangle the petrified Kelly. Pamela was once again sent to the asylum, but not before revealing that Capwell family friend Cassandra Benedict was really Minx Lockridge's illegitimate daughter.

References

Santa Barbara characters
Television characters introduced in 1987